Abbeydale is an area in the City of Sheffield, England that follows the valley of the River Sheaf. It covers many districts of Sheffield in the south-west of the city running roughly from Heeley Bridge in the district of Heeley to Dore Road between Beauchief and Totley. It is named for the Abbey that existed at Beauchief from the 12th century to 1537.

Although not the official name of any district, many businesses and institutions in the valley use Abbeydale in their name. These include:

The A621 Abbeydale Road, the main road along the valley.
The Abbeydale Brewery.
Abbeydale Picture House, a Grade II listed former cinema in Nether Edge.
Abbeydale Grange School, in Millhouses.
Abbeydale Industrial Hamlet, a former scythe works, now a museum and scheduled monument.
Beauchief railway station, which was originally called Beauchief and Abbey Dale railway station
Churches Together in Abbeydale.
Abbeydale Park in Dore

References

Areas of Sheffield